Antonín Rýgr (15 August 1921 – 28 March 1989) was a Czech football manager and former player.

As a player, Rýgr played mostly from SK Kladno before joining Sparta Prague in 1950. In 1952 and 1954 he won the Czechoslovak First League with Sparta. Rýgr also appeared in two matches of the national team in 1948.

After finishing his active career, Rýgr started to work as a football manager. He coached both famous Prague clubs, Slavia Prague and Sparta Prague. He also coached FK Teplice and Czechoslovakia national football team.

External links
  SK Slavia Praha profile
 Profile at ČMFS website

1921 births
1989 deaths
Czech footballers
Czechoslovak footballers
Czechoslovakia international footballers
SK Kladno players
AC Sparta Prague players
Czech football managers
Czechoslovak football managers
SK Slavia Prague managers
AC Sparta Prague managers
FK Teplice managers
Czechoslovakia national football team managers
Association football forwards
Sportspeople from Kladno